The  was a Shinkansen high-speed train type introduced by Japanese National Railways (JNR) for the Tohoku Shinkansen and Joetsu Shinkansen high-speed rail lines in Japan, and operated by East Japan Railway Company (JR East) until 2013. They actually predated the 100 series trains, having been built between 1980 and 1986. It was one of the two recipients of the 23rd Laurel Prize presented by the Japan Railfan Club, the first Shinkansen type to receive that award. The last remaining sets were retired from regular service in March 2013, and were completely withdrawn from service in April 2013.

Design
The 200 Series Shinkansen trains resembled the earlier 0 series trains in styling (some later units had the pointed 'shark nose' of the 100 series), but were lighter and more powerful, since these two lines are mountain routes and have steeper gradients. These lines are also prone to snowfall and the trains had small snowplows fitted, as well as protection of equipment against snow.

They were originally painted in ivory with a green window band and lower bodyside band, but a number of sets were refurbished and painted into a white-upper/dark blue-lower scheme with new wrap-around cab windows from 1999.

Some units were also modified with retractable couplers in the nose for coupling with Yamagata Shinkansen Tsubasa and Akita Shinkansen Komachi Mini-shinkansen sets, but these are no longer in service. In addition, some of the later 200 series shinkansen trains were fitted with double-deck cars, which had semi-open standard-class compartments on the lower deck and green class (first class) seating on the upper deck. These too have been removed from service.

Withdrawal of the earlier units began in 1997, and the last remaining unrefurbished set was withdrawn in May 2007.

Variants
Since their introduction in 1982, the 200 series sets have been operated in a number of different formations as described below.

E sets (1982–1993)
12-car sets for Tōhoku Shinkansen Yamabiko and Aoba services, and for Jōetsu Shinkansen Asahi and Toki services.

The 12-car E sets were formed as follows.

F sets (1983–2007)

Some F sets are similar to the H sets in that the driving trailer cars were built with a pointed nose, just like the latter. These trains however, feature a solid green line unlike the H sets, where they have two green lines, one thick and one thin, separated by a thin white section near the bottom.

Formations
The 12-car F sets were formed as follows, with car 1 at the Tokyo end. Car 11 was a Green (first class) car, and car 9 had a buffet counter.

Cars 2, 4, 10, and 12 were each fitted with one cross-arm pantograph. (3, 5, 7, and 9 for sets F90-93)

Interior

Set F80

One F set, F17, was specially modified at Sendai Depot between August 1997 and January 1998 for use on additional Nagano Shinkansen Asama services in February 1998 during the 1998 Winter Olympics held in Nagano. The train was renumbered F80, and modifications included ability to operate on both 25 kV AC 50 Hz and 60 Hz overhead power supplies, weight-saving measures to comply with the 16 tonne axle load restriction, and additional control equipment to cope with the 30‰ gradient of the Nagano Shinkansen. Maximum speed was limited to  when operating on the Nagano Shinkansen.

Seats in the end cars, cars 1 and 12, were replaced with 
E2 series-style seats to reduce weight.

The train was formed as follows, with car 1 at the Tokyo end. Car 11 was a Green (first class) car, and car 9 had a buffet counter.

Cars 2, 4, 8, and 10 were each fitted with one cross-arm pantograph.

After February 1998, set F80 was used interchangeably with other F sets, and remained in operation until 2004.

G sets (1987–1999)

These entered service from 18 April 1987.

Formations
The initial 10-car G sets were formed as follows.

The 8-car G sets were formed as follows.

Cars 2, 4, 6, and 8 were equipped with cross-arm pantographs. Some sets had an "Mpk" car (numbered 225-400) in place of the 237 buffet car for car 11.

H sets (1990–2005)

Six 13-car and later 16-car sets (H1–H6) with a maximum speed of 240 km/h for use on Yamabiko (nicknamed Super Yamabiko) services, incorporating two bilevel Green cars (cars 9 and 10) These sets entered service from 23 June 1990.

Regular operations using 16-car H sets ended from the start of the revised timetable on 13 March 2004, but sets H4 and H5 were reinstated as 12-car sets from the summer of 2004 for seasonal use with their Green cars removed. These two sets survived until mid-2005.

Formations
The initial 13-car H sets were formed as follows.

The 16-car H sets were formed as follows.

Cars 2, 4, 8, 12, and 14 were each fitted with one cross-arm pantograph.

The 12-car H sets (H4 & H5) were formed as follows.

Cars 2, 4, 6, 8, and 10 were each fitted with one cross-arm pantograph.

K sets (1992–2013)

8-car and later 10-car sets with a maximum speed of  modified with nose-end couplers to operate in conjunction with 400 series Yamagata Shinkansen sets and E3 series Akita Shinkansen sets.

The remaining sets in use on the Tōhoku Shinkansen were withdrawn from 19 November 2011, but 200 series sets continued to be used on the Jōetsu Shinkansen. The last remaining sets were withdrawn from regular service by the start of the revised timetable on 16 March 2013.

Formations
The K sets are formed as follows.

Interior

Special event train services

Tohoku Shinkansen 25th anniversary

On 23 June 2007, 10-car set K47 was used for a special Yamabiko 931 service from Omiya to Morioka to mark the 25th anniversary of the opening of the Tohoku Shinkansen. Set K47 was specially repainted back into its original ivory and green livery for this event.

Tohoku Shinkansen 30th anniversary
On 23 June 2012, 10-car set K47 was used for a special Yamabiko 235 service from Omiya to Morioka to mark the 30th anniversary of the opening of the Tohoku Shinkansen.

Joetsu Shinkansen 30th anniversary
On 17 November 2012, 10-car set K47 was used for a special  service, running as Toki 395, from Omiya to Niigata.

Sayonara 200 series Yamabiko
On 30 March 2013, 10-car set K47 was used for a special  train operated from Morioka to Tokyo, following the withdrawal of 200 series trains from regular scheduled services on 16 March.

Arigato 200 series
On 13 April 2013, a special  service ran from Sendai to Ueno in Tokyo.

Sayonara 200 series
On 14 April 2013, 10-car set K47 was used for two final  services from Niigata to Tokyo and from Omiya to Niigata, marking the last public operation of the 200 series trains.

Derailment

A refurbished 200 series train (set K25 on the Toki 325 service) derailed on the Jōetsu Shinkansen line while travelling at a speed of approximately 200 km/h between Nagaoka Station and Urasa Station on 23 October 2004 during the 2004 Chūetsu earthquake. Eight of the ten cars were derailed. This was the first derailment of a Shinkansen train in service. None of the 155 passengers on board was injured. Set K25 was officially withdrawn on 25 March 2005.

Preserved examples
 221-1 and 237-1 (ex-set E1, later F30) at Sendai General Shinkansen Depot
 215-1, 222-1, 226-1 (all ex-set E1, later F30), and 249-5 (ex-set H5) stored outdoors at Sendai General Shinkansen Depot, but all cut up in 2010
 215-15, 221-15 and 237-15 (ex-set E15, later F37) next to Nagareyama Onsen Station on the Hakodate Main Line (cut up in June 2013)
 222-35 (ex-set K31) at The Railway Museum in Saitama, Saitama
 221-1505 (ex-set K25) at JR East General Training Center in Shirakawa City. Fukushima Prefecture. where it's preserved and displayed. 
 221-1510 (ex-set F13, later K47) outside Niigata City Niitsu Railway Museum in Niitsu, Niigata since June 2013

See also 
List of high speed trains

Further reading

References

External links

 200 Series Toki/Tanigawa 

Shinkansen train series
East Japan Railway Company
Train-related introductions in 1982
Hitachi multiple units
Kawasaki multiple units
Nippon Sharyo multiple units
25 kV AC multiple units
Passenger trains running at least at 200 km/h in commercial operations
Kinki Sharyo multiple units
Tokyu Car multiple units